Lucka is a town in Germany.

Lucka may also refer to several other places in central Europe:

Poland
Łucka 
Łucka Kolonia

See also
Lúčka, several places in Slovakia